Group B of the 2008 Fed Cup Asia/Oceania Zone Group I was one of two pools in the Asia/Oceania Zone Group I of the 2008 Fed Cup. Four teams competed in a round robin competition, with the top team and the bottom two teams proceeding to their respective sections of the play-offs: the top teams played for advancement to the World Group II Play-offs, while the bottom teams faced potential relegation to Group II.

Chinese Taipei vs. Uzbekistan

Thailand vs. Hong Kong

Chinese Taipei vs. Hong Kong

Thailand vs. Uzbekistan

Chinese Taipei vs. Thailand

Uzbekistan vs. Hong Kong

See also
Fed Cup structure

References

External links
 Fed Cup website

2008 Fed Cup Asia/Oceania Zone